In Greek mythology, Xuthus  (Xouthos) was a Phthian prince who later became a king of Peloponnesus. He was the founder (through his sons) of the Achaean and Ionian nations.

Etymology 
According to the author, Robert Graves, Xuthus' name came from the ancient Greek word , meaning "sparrow".

Family 
Xuthus was a son of King Hellen of Thessaly and the nymph Orseis; and brother of Dorus, Aeolus, Xenopatra and probably Neonus. He had two sons, Ion and Achaeus, and a daughter named Diomede by Creusa, the Athenian daughter of King Erechtheus. Euripides's play, Ion, provided an unusual alternate version, according to which Xuthus was the son of Aeolus and Ion was in fact been begotten on Xuthus's wife Creusa by Apollo. Xuthus and Creusa visited the Oracle at Delphi to ask the god if they could hope for a child. Xuthus will later father Dorus and Achaeus with Creusa, though Dorus is normally presented as Xuthus's brother.

Mythology 
According to the Hesiodic Catalogue of Women on the origin of the Greeks, Hellen's three sons Dorus, Xuthus (with his sons Ion and Achaeus) and Aeolus, comprised the set of progenitors of the major ancient tribes that formed the Greek nation.

Genealogy of Hellenes

Notes

References 

Apollodorus, The Library with an English Translation by Sir James George Frazer, F.B.A., F.R.S. in 2 Volumes, Cambridge, MA, Harvard University Press; London, William Heinemann Ltd. 1921. ISBN 0-674-99135-4. Online version at the Perseus Digital Library. Greek text available from the same website.
Euripides, The Complete Greek Drama, edited by Whitney J. Oates and Eugene O'Neill, Jr. in two volumes. 1. Ion, translated by Robert Potter. New York. Random House. 1938. Online version at the Perseus Digital Library.
Euripides, Euripidis Fabulae. vol. 2. Gilbert Murray. Oxford. Clarendon Press, Oxford. 1913. Greek text available at the Perseus Digital Library.
Graves, Robert, The Greek Myths: The Complete and Definitive Edition. Penguin Books Limited. 2017. 
Hesiod, Catalogue of Women from Homeric Hymns, Epic Cycle, Homerica translated by Evelyn-White, H G. Loeb Classical Library Volume 57. London: William Heinemann, 1914. Online version at theio.com
Princes in Greek mythology
Deucalionids
Thessalian characters in Greek mythology
Attic mythology
Thessalian mythology